Babine is a Canadian fantasy drama film, directed by Luc Picard and released in 2008. Adapted from Fred Pellerin's book Il faut prendre le taureau par les contes, the film stars Vincent-Guillaume Otis as Babine, the village idiot of Saint-Élie-de-Caxton, Quebec. A lifelong outcast because his mother (Isabel Richer) was believed to be the town witch, he becomes the immediate suspect when the town's church catches fire, killing the parish priest (Julien Poulin). However, he will receive the support of the village's merchant, Toussaint Brodeur (Luc Picard), as he attempts to prove his innocence.

The film's cast also includes Alexis Martin, Gildor Roy, Marie Brassard and Antoine Bertrand.

A sequel film, Ésimésac, was released in 2012.

Cast

Reviews 
Babine received generally favourable reviews by the critics. It also received similar ratings from Rotten Tomatoes, with a 69% approval rating, and an average rating of 3.7 out of 5. Overall, the movie was quite successful, collecting $2.8 million at the Quebec box office.

Accolades 
The film received many awards and nominations, including two Genie Award nominations at the 30th Genie Awards in 2009: Best Supporting Actress (Richer) and Best Sound Editing (Olivier Calvert, Natalie Fleurant, Francine Poirier and Lise Wedlock).

References

External links

2008 films
Canadian fantasy drama films
Films directed by Luc Picard
Films scored by Normand Corbeil
2000s fantasy drama films
2008 drama films
2008 fantasy films
2000s French-language films
French-language Canadian films
2000s Canadian films